Nicole Westig (born 13 November 1967) is a German politician of the Free Democratic Party (FDP) who has been serving as a member of the Bundestag from the state of North Rhine-Westphalia since 2017.

Early life and career 
Westig grew up in her birthplace and graduated from high school there in 1987. From 1988 she studied Romance, Hispanic and Public Law at the University of Bonn, graduating as Magistra Artium in 1996. 

Westig was then employed by the German Association for Small and Medium-sized Businesses (BVMW), after which she worked independently in the field of press and public relations. From 2008 to 2014 she worked for the FDP as an advisor to Gerhard Papke at the State Parliament of North Rhine-Westphalia, after which she switched to fundraising in the charitable sector.

Political career
Westig first became a member of the Bundestag in the 2017 German federal election. She has since been serving as a member of the Health Committee, where she is her parliamentary group’s spokesperson for nursing.

In the negotiations to form a so-called traffic light coalition of the Social Democratic Party (SPD), the Green Party and the FDP following the 2021 federal elections, Westig was part of her party's delegation in the working group on health, co-chaired by Katja Pähle, Maria Klein-Schmeink and Christine Aschenberg-Dugnus.

In addition to her committee assignments, Westig has been a member of the German delegation to the Franco-German Parliamentary Assembly since 2022.

References

External links 

  
 Bundestag biography
 

 

 

1967 births
Living people
Members of the Bundestag for North Rhine-Westphalia
Female members of the Bundestag
21st-century German women politicians
Members of the Bundestag 2017–2021
Members of the Bundestag 2021–2025
Members of the Bundestag for the Free Democratic Party (Germany)